Ángel Maximiliano Puertas (born 23 January 1980 in Buenos Aires) is an Argentine football defender. He currently plays for Club Atlético Platense of the Argentine Third Division.

External links
 Ángel Maximiliano Puertas - Argentine Primera statistics at Fútbol XXI 
  
 Ángel Puertas at BDFA.com.ar 

1980 births
Living people
Footballers from Buenos Aires
Argentine footballers
Argentine expatriate footballers
Association football defenders
San Lorenzo de Almagro footballers
Club Almagro players
Club Atlético Belgrano footballers
Club Atlético Los Andes footballers
San Martín de San Juan footballers
Club Atlético Platense footballers
Club Atlético Huracán footballers
Club Atlético Independiente footballers
Argentine Primera División players
Expatriate footballers in Chile